Mable may refer to:

 Mable (business), a U.S. business accelerator
 Mable (name), list of people with the name

See also

Mabgate, from Mable-gate, Mable being a middle English reference to 'loose women'
Mabel (disambiguation)
Maple (disambiguation)